The 1989 Cornwall County Council election to the Cornwall County Council was held on 4 May 1989, as part of the wider 1989 local elections.

Results

|}

References

Cornwall
1989
1980s in Cornwall